Muslims are people who adhere to Islam, a monotheistic religion belonging to the Abrahamic tradition. They consider the Quran, the foundational religious text of Islam, to be the verbatim word of the God of Abraham (or Allah) as it was revealed to Muhammad, the main Islamic prophet. The majority of Muslims also follow the teachings and practices of Muhammad (sunnah) as recorded in traditional accounts (hadith).

With an estimated population of almost 1.9 billion followers as of 2020 year estimation, Muslims comprise more than 24.9% of the world's total population. In descending order, the percentage of people who identify as Muslims on each continental landmass stands at: 45% of Africa, 25% of Asia and Oceania (collectively), 6% of Europe, and 1% of the Americas. Additionally, in subdivided geographical regions, the figure stands at: 91% of the Middle East–North Africa, 90% of Central Asia, 65% of the Caucasus, 42% of Southeast Asia, 32% of South Asia, and 42% of sub-Saharan Africa.

While there are several Islamic schools and branches, the two largest denominations are Sunni Islam (75–90% of all Muslims) and Shia Islam (10–20% of all Muslims). By sheer numbers, South Asia accounts for the largest portion (31%) of the global Muslim population, primarily across three countries: Pakistan, India, and Bangladesh. By country, Indonesia is the largest in the Muslim world, holding around 12% of all Muslims worldwide; outside of the Muslim-majority countries, India and China are home to the largest (11%) and second-largest (2%) Muslim populations, respectively. Due to high Muslim population growth, Islam is the fastest-growing religion in the world.

Etymology

The word muslim (or moslem) is the active participle of the same verb of which islām is a verbal noun, based on the triliteral S-L-M "to be whole, intact". A female adherent is a muslima (also transliterated as "Muslimah" ). The plural form in Arabic is muslimūn or muslimīn, and its feminine equivalent is muslimāt.

The ordinary word in English is "Muslim". In the 20th century the preferred spelling in English was "Moslem", but this has now fallen into disuse. The word Mosalman (alternatively Mussalman) is a common equivalent for Muslim used in Central and South Asia. In English it was sometimes spelled Mussulman and has become archaic in usage. Until at least the mid-1960s, many English-language writers used the term Mohammedans or Mahometans. Although such terms were not necessarily intended to be pejorative, Muslims argue that the terms are offensive because they allegedly imply that Muslims worship Muhammad rather than God. Other obsolete terms include Muslimite and Muslimist. In Medieval Europe, Muslims were commonly called Saracens.

The Muslim philosopher Ibn Arabi said:

Qualifier

To become a Muslim and to convert to Islam, it is essential to utter the Shahada, one of the Five Pillars of Islam, a declaration of faith and trust that professes that there is only one God (Allah) and that Muhammad is God's messenger. It is a set statement normally recited in Arabic: ašhadu ʾal-lā ʾilāha ʾillā-llāhu wa ʾašhadu ʾanna muħammadan rasūlu-llāh  "I testify that there is no god [worthy of worship] except Allah, and Muhammad is the messenger of Allah."

In Sunni Islam, the shahada has two parts: la ilaha illa'llah (there is no god but Allah), and Muhammadun rasul Allah (Muhammad is the messenger of God), which are sometimes referred to as the first shahada and the second shahada. The first statement of the shahada is also known as the tahlīl.

In Shia Islam, the shahada also has a third part, a phrase concerning Ali, the first Shia Imam and the fourth Rashid caliph of Sunni Islam: , which translates to "Ali is the wali of God".

In Quranist Islam, the shahada is the testimony that there is no god but Allah (la ilaha illa'llah ).

The religious practices of Muslims are enumerated in the Five Pillars of Islam: the declaration of faith (shahadah), daily prayers (salah), almsgiving (zakat), fasting during the month of Ramadan (sawm), and the pilgrimage to Mecca (hajj) at least once in a lifetime.

In Islamic theology

The Qur'an describes many prophets and messengers within Judaism and Christianity, and their respective followers, as Muslim. Some of those that were mentioned are: Adam, Noah, Abraham, Ishmael, Jacob, Moses, and Jesus and his apostles are all considered to be Muslims in the Qur'an. The Qur'an states that these men were Muslims because they submitted to God, preached His message and upheld His values, which included praying, charity, fasting and pilgrimage. Thus, in Surah 3:52 of the Qur'an, Jesus' disciples tell him, "We believe in God; and you be our witness that we are Muslims (wa-shahad be anna muslimūn)." In Islamic belief, before the Qur'an, God had given the Tawrat (Torah) to Moses, the Zabur (Psalms) to David and the Injil (Gospel) to Jesus, who are all considered important Muslim prophets.

Demographics

The most populous Muslim-majority country is Indonesia, home to 12.7% of the world's Muslims, followed by Pakistan (11.0%), Bangladesh (9.2%), Nigeria (5.3%) and Egypt (4.9%). About 20% of the world's Muslims live in the Middle East and North Africa.

Sizable minorities are also found in India, China, Ethiopia, the Americas, Australia and parts of Europe. The country with the highest proportion of self-described Muslims as a proportion of its total population is Morocco.

Over 75–90% of Muslims are Sunni. The second and third largest sects, Shia and Ahmadiyya, make up 10–20%, and 1% respectively.

With about 1.9 billion followers (2019), almost a quarter of earth's population, Islam is the second-largest and the fastest-growing religion in the world, primarily due to the young age and high fertility rate of Muslims, with Muslims having a rate of (3.1) compared to the world average of (2.5). According to the same study, religious switching has no impact on Muslim population, since the number of people who embrace Islam and those who leave Islam are roughly equal.

A Pew Center study in 2016 found that Muslims have the highest number of adherents under the age of 15 (34% of the total Muslim population) of any major religion, while only 7% are aged 60+ (the smallest percentage of any major religion). According to the same study, Muslims have the highest fertility rates (3.1) of any major religious group. The study also found that Muslims (tied with Hindus) have the lowest average levels of education with an average of 5.6 years of schooling, though both groups have made the largest gains in educational attainment in recent decades among major religions. About 36% of all Muslims have no formal schooling, and Muslims have the lowest average levels of higher education of any major religious group, with only 8% having graduate and post-graduate degrees.

Culture

Muslim culture or Islamic culture are terms used to describe the cultural practices common to Muslims and historically Islamic people. The early forms of Muslim culture, from the Rashidun Caliphate to early Umayyad period, were predominantly Arab, Byzantine, Persian and Levantine. With the rapid expansion of the Islamic empires, Muslim culture has influenced and assimilated much from the Persian, Egyptian, Bengali, Caucasian, Turkic, Mongol, South Asian, Malay, Somali, Berber, Indonesian, and Moro cultures.

See also
 Cultural Muslims
 Islamic schools and branches
 Mohammedan
 Lists of Muslims
 List of converts to Islam
 Islamic holidays
 Muslim world
 Mumin
 Persecution of Muslims

References

External links

Ritual Prayer: Its Meaning and Manner – The Islamic Supreme Council of America.
Muhammad and the First Muslim Ummah – University of Chicago
 Islamophobia Today Newspaper – An Islamophobia news clearing house
 Sammy Aziz Rahmatti, Understanding and Countering Islamophobia
WikiSaurus:Muslim
 
 

 
 
Quranic words and phrases
Religious identity